John Duffey (March 17, 1836 – August 21, 1923) was an American soldier who fought in the American Civil War. Duffey received the country's highest award for bravery during combat, the Medal of Honor, for his action at Ashepoo River in South Carolina on 24 May 1864. He was honored with the award on 21 January 1897.

Biography
Duffey was born in New Bedford, Massachusetts on 17 March 1836. He joined the Army from New Bedford in December 1863, and mustered out with his regiment in November 1865. Duffey died on 21 August 1923 and his remains are interred at Oak Grove Cemetery in New Bedford, Massachusetts.

Medal of Honor citation

See also

List of American Civil War Medal of Honor recipients: A–F

References

1836 births
1923 deaths
People of Massachusetts in the American Civil War
Union Army officers
United States Army Medal of Honor recipients
American Civil War recipients of the Medal of Honor